Simone Bianchi (born 27 January 1973) is a retired Italian long jumper.

Biography
He won the Europe Cup 1996 in Madrid achieving his personal best. He was 4 times Italian Champion. He finished fourth at the 1998 European Championships.

His personal best jump was 8.25 metres, achieved in June 1996 in Madrid. In Italy only Giovanni Evangelisti and Andrew Howe has jumped farther.

Achievements

National titles
Simone Bianchi has won 4 times the individual national championship.
3 wins in the long jump (1993, 1996, 1998)
1 win in the long jump indoor (1997)

See also
 Italian all-time lists - Long jump

References

External links
 

1973 births
Living people
Italian male long jumpers
Athletes (track and field) at the 1996 Summer Olympics
Athletics competitors of Centro Sportivo Carabinieri
Olympic athletes of Italy
20th-century Italian people
21st-century Italian people